Engraulis is a genus of anchovies.  It currently contains nine species.

Species
 Engraulis albidus Borsa, Collet & J. D. Durand, 2004 (White anchovy)
 Engraulis anchoita C. L. Hubbs & Marini, 1935 (Argentine anchoita)
 Engraulis australis (J. White, 1790) (Australian anchovy)
 Engraulis capensis Gilchrist, 1913 (Southern African anchovy)
 Engraulis encrasicolus (Linnaeus, 1758) (European anchovy)
 Engraulis eurystole (Swain & Meek, 1885) (Silver anchovy)
 Engraulis japonicus Temminck & Schlegel, 1846 (Japanese anchovy)
 Engraulis mordax Girard, 1854 (Californian anchovy)
 Engraulis ringens Jenyns, 1842 (Peruvian anchoveta)

References

 Genera reference: 
  Valid species of the genus Engraulis. FishBase. Ed. Ranier Froese and Daniel Pauly. January 2006 version. N.p.: FishBase, 2006.

 
Extant Miocene first appearances
Marine fish genera
Taxa named by Georges Cuvier
Anchovies